Words is the debut album by American R&B musician Tony Rich (under the moniker "The Tony Rich Project"), released January 16, 1996 on LaFace Records. The album is produced, written, arranged and performed by Rich. In 1997, the album won the Grammy Award for Best R&B Album.

At the start of 1996 with the acoustic R&B ballad, "Nobody Knows", the song was a hit, peaking at number two for two weeks, going platinum, and spending almost a year on the Billboard Hot 100 (47 weeks).

In total three singles were released from Words: "Nobody Knows", "Like a Woman", and "Leavin'".

Track listing
All songs written by Tony Rich except "Nobody Knows" (written by Joe Rich & Don DuBose).

 "Hey Blue" – 3:48
 "Nobody Knows" – 5:06
 "Like a Woman" – 4:08
 "Grass is Green" – 4:08
 "Ghost" – 4:21
 "Leavin'" – 3:44
 "Billy Goat" – 4:11
 "Under Her Spell" – 4:24
 "Little Ones" – 3:37
 "Missin' You" – 3:49

Personnel
Tony Rich – all instruments, vocals, programming
Nuri – additional vocals on "Under Her Spell"
Joe Rich – keyboards on "Nobody Knows"
John Frye – second acoustic guitar on "Ghost"
Peter Moore – acoustic guitar on "Nobody Knows" and "Missin' You"
Reggie Griffin – electric guitar on "Hey Blue" and "Missin' You", solo and rhythm guitars on "Like a Woman", feedback on "Ghost", wah wah guitar on "Billy Goat"
Colin Wolfe – bass guitar on "Ghost"

Charts

Certifications

References

1996 debut albums
Tony Rich albums
LaFace Records albums
Grammy Award for Best R&B Album
Neo soul albums